Emilie Isabel Barrington (18 October 1841 – 9 March 1933), was a British biographer and novelist.

Bibliography
In addition to writing articles for the serials Fortnightly Review and The Spectator, Barrington wrote several stand-alone works:
 Reminiscences of G. F. Watts (1905)
 Lena's Picture (1892) (novel)
 Helen's Ordeal (1894) (novel)
 The Reality of the Spiritual Life (1889) (pamphlet)
 Complete works of Walter Bagehot (editor) 1914
 The Servant of All (1927)
 The Love Letters of Walter Bagehot and Eliza Wilson (editor) (1933)
 Memories of a long life (autobiography - lost)

References

1841 births
1933 deaths